Panama competed at the 2019 Parapan American Games held from August 23 to September 1, 2019 in Lima, Peru. In total athletes representing Panama won one silver medal and one bronze medal. Both medals were won in athletics. The country finished in 21st place in the medal table.

Medalists

Athletics 

Francisco Cedeño won the silver medal in the men's shot put F55 event.

Gertrudis Ortega won the bronze medal in the men's shot put F32/33/34 event.

References 

2019 in Panamanian sport
Nations at the 2019 Parapan American Games